"Strut" is the second single from The Cheetah Girls 2 movie soundtrack.

Background and composition 
The single officially premiered on Radio Disney on June 20, 2006 and was released officially for digital download on August 8. The song was produced by Jamie Houston. The single debuted at #60 on the Billboard Hot 100, becoming their second single to chart. The song is their most successful single considered that it's their highest peaking single to date, peaking at #53 on the Billboard charts.

Vocals 
The track features Adrienne Bailon on lead vocals, with each girl having some solo verses. Kiely Williams and Raven-Symoné lead the chorus with Bailon, while Sabrina Bryan has a couple lines during the chorus. Symoné and Williams also sing some ad-libs. When live, Bailon, Bryan and Williams took Symoné's parts. All 3 girls sings the chorus.

Music video 
The Cheetah Girls did not shoot a video for the single because the song was from their new film The Cheetah Girls 2 and was used to promote the film. Because of that, the video for the song features clips from the movie and the girls dancing, singing and running through the streets of Barcelona which is also a clip from the movie/musical. It premiered on August 12, 2006 on Disney Channel.

Track listing 
 "Strut"
 "Radio Disney Exclusive Interview"
 "Cheetah Girls 2 Trailer" (video, only available on iTunes)

Charts

Release details

Trivia 
 Peter Vives sings on the track and is also in the music video. Until the release of The Cheetah Girls 2 he was never credited, but he is simply listed as "Angel" on the inside booklet of The Cheetah Girls 2.
 This was the follow-up single to "The Party's Just Begun" and was the most successful single, and was quickly followed up by "Step Up".
 While performing at the Disney Channel Games in 2007, they shortened the song. The song opened with their opening lines of the song excluding Raven's, and before the second chorus they added a brief dance mix. The rest of the song was intact.

References 

2006 singles
The Cheetah Girls songs
Songs written for films
Walt Disney Records singles
Songs written by Jamie Houston (songwriter)